Pyrene flava, common name : the yellow dove shell, is a species of sea snail, a marine gastropod mollusk in the family Columbellidae, the dove snails.

Subspecies
 Pyrene flava filmerae (G. B. Sowerby III, 1900)
 Pyrene flava flava (Bruguière, 1789)

Description
The shell size varies between 12 mm and 25 mm.

Distribution
This species occurs in the Red Sea and in the Indian Ocean off Madagascar, Tanzania and in the Indo-West Pacific.

References

 Dautzenberg, Ph. (1929). Mollusques testaces marins de Madagascar. Faune des Colonies Francaises, Tome III
 Spry, J.F. (1961). The sea shells of Dar es Salaam: Gastropods. Tanganyika Notes and Records 56
 Liu, J.Y. [Ruiyu] (ed.). (2008). Checklist of marine biota of China seas. China Science Press. 1267 pp.

External links
 
 Duclos, P.L. (1840). Histoire naturelle générale et particulière de tous les genres de coquilles univalves marines à l'état vivant et fossile, publiée par mo­nographie. Genre Colombelle. Didot, Paris. 13 pls
 Lamarck, (J.-B. M.) de. (1822). Histoire naturelle des animaux sans vertèbres. Tome septième. Paris: published by the Author, 711 pp.
 Kiener L.C. (1834-1841). Spécies général et iconographie des coquilles vivantes. Vol. 9. Famille des Purpurifères. Deuxième partie. Genres Colombelle, (Columbella), Lamarck, pp. 1-63, pl. 1-16 [pp. 1-63 (1841); pl. 2-4, 6, 8, 11 (1840), 1, 5, 7, 9-10, 12-16 (1841); Buccin (Buccinum), Adanson, pp. 1-112 + table with duplicate page numbers 105-108, pl. 1-31 [pp. 1-64 (1834), 65-104 and 105-108 of table (1835), 105-112 of text (1841); pl. 1-24 (1834), 25-29 (1835), 30-31 (1841); Eburne (Eburna), Lamarck, pp. 1-8, pl. 1-3 [all (1835)]; Struthiolaire (Struthiolaria), Lamarck, pp. 1-6, pl. 1-2 [pp]. 1-6 (1838); pl. 1-2 (1837)]; Vis (Terebra, Bruguière, pp. 1-42 + table, pl. 1-14 [pp. 1-42 (1838); pl. 1-14 (1837)]. Paris, Rousseau & J.B. Baillière.]
 Duclos P.L. (1846-1850). Colombella. In J.C. Chenu, Illustrations conchyliologiques ou description et figures de toutes les coquilles connues vivantes et fossiles, classées suivant le système de Lamarck modifié d'après les progrès de la science et comprenant les genres nouveaux et les espèces récemment découvertes. Volume 4: pls 1-18
 Hervier J. (1900 ["1899"). Le genre Columbella dans l'archipel de la Nouvelle-Calédonie. Journal de Conchyliologie. 47(4): 305–391, pls 13-14]

Columbellidae
Gastropods described in 1789